Institut Supérieur Polytechnique Arsenal (also known as ISPA) is a Malagasy private university established in Moramanga (west coast of Madagascar in the province of Tamatave). After 6 years of existence, I.S.P.A. has established an annex in the capital, Antananarivo (school year 2012-2013).

References

Universities in Madagascar